Lesovozny is a rural locality (a passing loop) in Pribaykalsky District, Republic of Buryatia, Russia. The population was 116 as of 2010.

References 

Rural localities in Okinsky District